St. Katharine Drexel Preparatory School (also known as Drexel Prep or SKDP) is a private Catholic high school in New Orleans, Louisiana.

History 
It was established in 2013 by six alumni of Xavier Prep, who purchased the building after the previous school was closed.

Location 
The campus is in Uptown New Orleans.

It has no affiliation with the St Katharine Drexel Catholic Church in the Garden District, which instead had a parish school, Holy Ghost School, that closed in 2015.

Athletics
St. Katharine Drexel Preparatory athletics competes in the LHSAA.

See also

 Black Catholicism
Katharine Drexel

References

External links
 School Website

Private middle schools in New Orleans
Private high schools in New Orleans
Catholic secondary schools in New Orleans
Educational institutions established in 2013
2013 establishments in Louisiana
Uptown New Orleans
Catholic schools in Louisiana
African-American Roman Catholic schools